English Bazar Assembly constituency is an assembly constituency in Maldah district in the Indian state of West Bengal.

Overview
As per orders of the Delimitation Commission, No. 51 English Bazar Assembly constituency covers English Bazar Municipality and Amriti, Binodpur Gram Panchayat, Jadupur I, Jadupur II, Kajigram, Kotwali and Mahadipur gram panchayats of English Bazar community development block,

English Bazar Assembly constituency is part of No. 8 Maldaha Dakshin (Lok Sabha constituency). It was earlier part of Malda (Lok Sabha constituency).

Members of Legislative Assembly

Election results

2021

2016
In the 2016 election, Nihar Ranjan Ghosh of Left Front-Congress Supported Independent defeated his nearest rival Krishnendu Narayan Chowdhury of Congress.

.# Swing based on LF+Congress vote percentages taken together in 2016.

2013 bye election
The 2013 by-election was necessitated by the switch-over of sitting Congress MLA Krishnendu Narayan Choudhury to Trinamool Congress.

2011
In the 2011 election, Krishnendu Narayan Chowdhury of Congress defeated his nearest rival Samarananda Roy of CPI(M).

.# Swing based on Congress+Trinamool Congress vote percentages taken together in 2006.

1977–2006
In the 2006 state assembly elections, Krishnendu Narayan Choudhury of Congress won the English Bazar assembly seat defeating his nearest rival Samar Roy of CPI(M). Contests in most years were multi cornered but only winners and runners are being mentioned. Samar Roy of CPI(M) defeated Goutam Chakraborty of Congress in 2001. Goutam Chakraborty of Congress defeated Ashok Bhattacharya of CPI(M) in 1996. Prabhat Acharya of CPI(M) defeated Pradip Kar of Congress in 1991. Sailen Sarkar of CPI(M) defeated Ashok Kundu of Congress in 1987, Swapan Mitra of Congress in 1982 and Hari Prasanna Mitra of Janata Party in 1977.

1957–1972
Bimal Kanti Das of CPI won in 1972, 1971 and 1969. Santi Gopal Sen of Congress won in 1967, 1962 and 1957. Prior to that the English Bazar seat was not there.

References

Assembly constituencies of West Bengal
Politics of Malda district